Fale Fatu (or Falefatu) is an islet of Funafuti, Tuvalu. Te Ava Pua Pua is the passage through the reef, with a least depth of 12.7 metres, between the islets of Funamanu to the north and Fale Fatu to the south, in the southeast of Funafuti atoll.

References

Pacific islands claimed under the Guano Islands Act
Islands of Tuvalu
Funafuti